Moller, Möller, Møller or von Möller is a surname. Notable people with the surname include:

Adolf Möller, German olympic rower
Ale Möller, Swedish musician and composer
Alex Möller, German politician
Andreas Möller, German footballer
Axel Möller, Swedish astronomer
Baldur Möller, Icelandic chess master
Carl Møller, Danish rower in 1912 Olympics
Chris Moller (businessman), New Zealand businessman and sports administrator
Chris Moller (architect), New Zealand architect
Christian Moeller, German artist and architect born 1959
Christian Möller, German artist and painter born 1963
Christian Møller, Danish chemist and physicist born 1904
David Möller, German sportsman
Edvard Möller, Swedish athlete in 1912 Olympics
Egon Möller-Nielsen
Erik Möller
Faron Moller
Frank Möller, German judo sportsman
Frank Möller (athlete), German sprinter
Frans Möller (disambiguation)
Gustav Möller, Swedish Social Democratic politician
Gustav Möller (athlete), Swedish athlete
Hans Hartvig-Møller
Hans Møller Gasmann
Henry Möller (1749–1829), United States clergyman (see )
Hermann Möller, Danish linguist
Irmgard Möller
Ivan Möller, Swedish athlete
Jan Möller, Swedish footballer
Joost Möller, Dutch politician
Julia Möller  (born 1949), Uruguayan television presenter and model
Karl von Möller, Australian director and cinematographer
Karl Leopold von Möller, Austrian politician and writer
Klaus Peter Möller (1937-2022), German politician
Lillian Moller Gilbreth
Lorraine Moller
M. P. Moller, pipe organ builder
Marc Møller
Martin Moller, German poet
Mike Moller
Myra Moller
Ola Möller (born 1983), Swedish politician
Olof Möller, Swedish science fiction author
Orla Møller, Danish priest and politician
Oscar Möller, Swedish ice hockey player
Paul Moller, engineer
Moller Skycar
Per Möller Jensen
Ralf Möller, German actor and ex-bodybuilder
Randy Moller
Rene Moller (born 1946), Danish footballer
Robert Moeller, Deputy Commander of Military Operations, US Africa Command
Roland Møller, Danish actor
Sandra Möller, German sprinter
Sebastian Möller, German expert for voice technology
Shona Moller
Siemtje Möller (born 1983), German politician
Silke Möller
Steffen Möller
Susan Moller Okin
Thomas Möller, Swedish criminal and ex-president of Hells Angels Sweden
Tommy Möller Swedish political science professor at Stockholm University
William Bruhn-Möller

Other
A. P. Moller-Maersk Group

See also
Møller, surname
Moeller, surname
Moler (surname)

Swedish-language surnames
Low German surnames
Jewish surnames
Occupational surnames